Giacomo Ferrari (born 19 July 1996) is an Italian sailor. He competed in the men's 470 event at the 2020 Summer Olympics.

References

External links
 
 

1996 births
Living people
Italian male sailors (sport)
Olympic sailors of Italy
Sailors at the 2020 Summer Olympics – 470
Sportspeople from Rome